In the material culture of classical antiquity, a phiale or patera is a shallow ceramic or metal libation bowl. It often has a bulbous indentation (omphalos, "belly button") in the center underside to facilitate holding it, in which case it is sometimes called a mesomphalic phiale. It typically has no handles, and no feet. Although the two terms may be used interchangeably, particularly in the context of Etruscan culture, phiale is more common in reference to Greek forms, and patera in Roman settings, not to be confused with the Greek  or Father.

Use

Libation was a central and vital aspect of ancient Greek religion, and one of the simplest and most common forms of religious practice. It is one of the basic religious acts that define piety in ancient Greece, dating back to the Bronze Age and even prehistoric Greece. Libations were a part of daily life, and the pious might perform them every day in the morning and evening, as well as to begin meals. A libation most often consisted of mixed wine and water, but could also be unmixed wine, honey, oil, water, or milk.

The form of libation called spondē is typically the ritualized pouring of wine from a jug or bowl held in the hand. The most common ritual was to pour the liquid from an oinochoē (wine jug) into a phiale. Libation generally accompanied prayer. The Greeks stood when they prayed, either with their arms uplifted, or in the act of libation with the right arm extended to hold the phiale. After the wine offering was poured from the phiale, the remainder of the contents was drunk by the celebrant.

In Roman art, the libation is shown performed at an altar, mensa (sacrificial meal table), or tripod. It was the simplest form of sacrifice, and could be a sufficient offering by itself. The introductory rite (praefatio) to an animal sacrifice included an incense and wine libation onto a burning altar. Both emperors and divinities are frequently depicted, especially on coins, pouring libations from a patera. Scenes of libation and the patera itself commonly signify the quality of pietas, religious duty or reverence.

Architecture
In architecture, oval features on plaster friezes on buildings may be called paterae (plural).

See also
Parabiago patera, which is actually a platter or plate

References

Ancient Roman religion
Ancient Greek pot shapes
Libation
Ancient Greek metalwork